Autochloris flavosignata is a moth of the subfamily Arctiinae. It was described by Rothschild in 1931. It is found in Guyana.

References

Arctiinae
Moths described in 1931
Moths of South America